Mbagala is an administrative ward in the Temeke district of the Dar es Salaam Region of Tanzania. The ward lies south of the Dar es Salaam central business district. According to the 2002 census, the ward has a total population of 70,290. It is also the site of an army base, which was hit by a deadly ammunition dump explosion on April 29, 2009.

References

Temeke District
Wards of Dar es Salaam Region